Senator Kellogg may refer to:

United States Senate members
Frank B. Kellogg (1856–1937), U.S. Senator from Minnesota from 1917 to 1923. 
William Pitt Kellogg (1830–1918), U.S. Senator from Louisiana from 1868 to 1872 and from 1877 to 1883

United States state senate members
Charles Kellogg (state senator) (1839–1903), New York State Senate
Daniel Kellogg (judge) (1791–1875), Vermont State Senate
Ensign H. Kellogg (1812–1882), Massachusetts State Senate
J. A. Kellogg (1871–1962), Washington State Senate
John Azor Kellogg (1828–1883), Wisconsin State Senate
Lewis G. Kellogg (1856–1943), Wisconsin State Senate
Rowland C. Kellogg (1843–1911), New York State Senate
Sanford Brown Kellogg (1822–1893), Missouri State Senate
Stephen Wright Kellogg (1822–1904), Connecticut State Senate